The Baham Museum is an art and cultural museum located in the town of Baham, Cameroon.

References
Museum homepage

Museums in Cameroon